The 1997–98 Argentine Primera División was the 107th season of top-flight football in Argentina. The season ran from August 22, 1997, to June 8, 1998. Argentinos Juniors (champion of 1996–97 Primera B Nacional) and Gimnasia y Tiro were promoted from Primera B Nacional.

River Plate won the Apertura (29th. league title) while Vélez Sársfield won the Clausura (5th. title). On the other hand, Gimnasia y Tiro and Deportivo Español were relegated with the worst points averages.

Permanent squad numbers were established as mandatory by the AFA, starting in the 1997 Apertura. As the rule did not specify the use of number "1" for goalkeepers exclusively, forward Silvio Carrario wore that number in Deportivo Español.

Torneo Apertura

League standings

Top scorers

Torneo Clausura

League standings

Top scorers

See also
1997–98 in Argentine football

References

Argentine Primera División seasons
1
Argentine
Argentine